15th Joseph Plateau Awards
2003

Best Film: 
 Pauline & Paulette 
The 15th Joseph Plateau Awards honoured the best Belgian filmmaking of 2000 and 2001.

Winners

Best Belgian Actor
 Dirk Roofthooft - Don't Cry Germaine (Pleure pas Germaine)
Koen De Bouw - The Publishers (Lijmen/Het been)
Benoît Poelvoorde - Doors of Glory (Les portes de la gloire)

Best Belgian Actress
Dora van der Groen - Pauline & Paulette
Catherine Grosjean - Don't Cry Germaine (Pleure pas Germaine)
Ann Petersen - Pauline & Paulette

Best Belgian Director
 Lieven Debrauwer - Pauline & Paulette
Robbe De Hert - Lijmen/Het been
Gérard Corbiau - The King Is Dancing (Le roi danse)

Best Belgian Film
 Pauline & Paulette
Don't Cry Germaine (Pleure pas Germaine)
The Publishers (Lijmen/Het been)

Best Belgian Screenplay
 Pauline & Paulette - Jaak Boon and Lieven Debrauwer
The Publishers (Lijmen/Het been)
The King Is Dancing (Le roi danse)

Box Office Award
 Pauline & Paulette

Joseph Plateau Music Award
 Arno - Ties and Ropes (Le bal des pantins)

2001 film awards